Nehemiah is the central figure of the Book of Nehemiah in the Bible.

Nehemiah may also refer to:
Book of Nehemiah, a book of the Hebrew Bible

People

Given name
Nehemiah Bourne (c. 1611–1690), British Royal Navy Admiral
Nehemiah, Archbishop of Esztergom (11th century)
Nehemiah Grew (1641–1712), British plant physiologist
Nehemiah Goreh (1825-1895), Hindu and Christian apologist from British India
Nehemiah Hawkins (1833–1928), American inventor, publisher and author
Nehemia Levtzion (1935—2003), Israeli scholar of African history, Near East, Islamic, and African studies, President of the Open University of Israel, and Executive Director of the Van Leer Jerusalem Institute
Nehemiah Samuel Libowitz (1862–1939), Hebrew scholar and author
Nehemiah Perry (born 1968), West Indian cricketer
Nehemiah Persoff (1919–2022), American actor
Rabbi Nehemiah, a Rabbi who lived circa 150 AD
Skip James (1902–1969), American blues musician, born Nehemiah Curtis James

Surname
Renaldo Nehemiah (born 1959), American athlete

Music
Nehemiah (band), a metalcore band with Uprising Records
"Nehemiah", a 2004 song by Hope of the States

Other
Nehemiah Corporation of America, a non-profit organization helping low income home buyers
VIA Nehemeia, a VIA C3 CPU revision produced by VIA Technologies
Nehemiah Scudder, the antagonist in Robert A. Heinlein's short novel If This Goes On—

English masculine given names